The 2013 Minor Counties Championship was the 109th Minor Counties Cricket Championship season. It was contested through two divisions: Eastern and Western. Cheshire were Minor County Champions for the fifth time outright and seventh in total.

Standings
 Pld = Played, W = Wins, W1 = Win in match reduced to single innings, L = Losses, L1 = Loss in match reduced to single innings, T = Ties, D = Draws, D1 = Draw in match reduced to single innings, A = Abandonments, Bat = Batting points, Bowl = Bowling points, Ded = Deducted points, Pts = Points, Net RPW = Net runs per wicket (runs per wicket for less runs per wicket against).

Teams receive 16 points for a win, 8 for a tie and 4 for a draw. Teams also received 12 points for a win, 6 for a draw and 4 points for losing a match reduced to a single innings. Bonus points (a maximum of 4 batting points and 4 bowling points) may be scored during the first 90 overs of each team's first innings.

Eastern Division

Western Division

Final

Averages

References

2013 in English cricket
2013
Domestic cricket competitions in 2012–13